Michael Murphy (born 6 February 1942) is an Irish nationalist politician in Northern Ireland. Active in Irish republicanism after getting involved with the Northern Ireland Civil Rights Association of the 1960s, he worked as a publican. In 1996 he was elected as a member of the Northern Ireland Forum for Sinn Féin in South Down. Murphy was the unsuccessful Sinn Féin candidate for South Down in the 1997 election to the United Kingdom Parliament; a few months later he was elected to Newry and Mourne District Council.

He was then elected from the same constituency to the Northern Ireland Assembly in 1998. He was Sinn Féin spokesperson on Housing. He was again elected as a councillor for Newry and Mourne District Council from the Crotlieve electoral area in 2005.

References

1942 births
Living people
People from Banbridge
Members of the Northern Ireland Forum
Northern Ireland MLAs 1998–2003
Mayors of places in Northern Ireland
Members of Newry and Mourne District Council
Sinn Féin MLAs
Sinn Féin councillors in Northern Ireland
Sinn Féin parliamentary candidates